Jo Rowbottom (born 1942) is a British character actress, best known for guest roles in numerous British TV series, and as James Beck's wife in Romany Jones.

Film credits
Night of the Prowler (1962) - Elsie
The Bargee (1964) - Cynthia (credited as Jo Rowbotham)
You Must Be Joking! (1965) - Librarian (uncredited)
The Liquidator (1965) - Betty
Follow That Camel (1967) - Harem Girl (uncredited)
Two a Penny (1968) - Helen
Along the Way (1972) (credited as Jo Rowbotham)
That Summer! (1979) - Pub landlady

Selected television credits

Steptoe and Son (Series 2 - 1963) - 'Is That Your Horse Outside?' - Waitress
Gideon's Way (1964, TV episode "The rhyme and the reason") - Mary Rose
 The Sullavan Brothers (1964) - Joyce Warren
Z-Cars (1964-1972) - Kate Gordon / Joyce Alty / Micki / Stella Aldridge
Mogul (1965) - Kitt Body
Dixon of Dock Green (1966-1976) - Julie Taylor / Joyce / Jessie Copeland / Rosie Everett / Sheila Thompson / Sylvia / Jean
The Baron (1966) - Jane
Doctor Who (in the serial The Evil of the Daleks) (1967) - Mollie Dawson
 Sinister Street (1969) - Daisy Palmer
Romany Jones (1972-1973) - Betty Jones
 The Rivals of Sherlock Holmes (1971) - The Assyrian Rejuvenator - Suzie Shepherd
Sam and the River (1975) - Katie Leigh
I, Claudius (1976) - Calpurnia
Dick Turpin (1979-1980) - Mary / Mrs. Smith
The Professionals (1980) - Barmaid
Terry and June (1980) - Cynthia
 The Franchise Affair (1988) - Mildred Pinner
The Bill (1989) - Sylvia
Love Hurts (1992) - Jackie Carver

Theatre
She studied at The Questors Theatre in Ealing, West London.

References

External links
 

British television actresses
1942 births
Living people